World Shut Your Mouth may be:
World Shut Your Mouth (album), an album by Julian Cope
"World Shut Your Mouth" (song), a single by Julian Cope from his album Saint Julian
World Shut Your Mouth (TV series), a 2005 television series starring Dom Joly
World Shut Your Mouth (DVD), a 2003 DVD by punk rock band The Dickies